The 1892 Illinois gubernatorial election was held on November 8, 1892.

Incumbent Republican Governor Joseph W. Fifer was defeated by Democratic nominee John Peter Altgeld who won 48.74% of the vote. Altgeld was the first Democratic Governor of Illinois elected since 1852, before the foundation of the Republican Party.

Democratic nomination

Candidates
John Peter Altgeld, former Justice of the Superior Court of Cook County
John C. Black, former United States Commissioner of Pensions
Andrew Jackson Hunter, judge of the Edgar County court
William H. Neece, former U.S. Congressman for Illinois's 11th congressional district
Delos P. Phelps, Democratic nominee for Illinois's 10th congressional district in 1878

Results
The Democratic state convention was held on April 27, 1892, at Springfield.

Republican nomination

Candidates
Joseph W. Fifer, incumbent Governor
Joel Minnick Longenecker, state’s attorney in Chicago, Cook County
Horace S. Clark
George Hunt, incumbent Illinois Attorney General
Benjamin Franklin Marsh, former U.S. Congressman for Illinois's 10th congressional district

Results
The Republican state convention was held on May 4 and 5, 1892 at Springfield.

General election

Candidates
John Peter Altgeld, Democratic
Joseph W. Fifer, Republican 
Nathan M. Barnett, People's Party, Union Labor nominee for Illinois State Treasurer in 1888
Robert R. Link, Prohibition, Prohibition nominee for Illinois State Treasurer in 1890

Results

References

Notes

Bibliography

Governor
1892
Illinois
November 1892 events